The Tank Mountains (Yavapai: Hakimatava) are a mountain range in the Sonoran Desert of southwest Arizona; the range is part of the southeastern border of the Kofa National Wildlife Refuge.

The western two thirds of the mountains lie in the Kofa National Wildlife Refuge and connect to the southeast corner of the Kofa Mountains where the Kofa Butte is located, across Engesser Pass.

The Tank Mountains abut the Palomas Mountains on the south, which are also partly in the wildlife refuge. North, east, and southeast of the Tank Mountains lies the extensive Palomas Plain which drains southeastly towards Hyder and the Gila River valley. To the northeast across the Palomas Plain lies the Little Horn Mountains and the adjacent Eagletail Mountains Wilderness. To the southwest is the southeast draining King Valley with the Castle Dome Mountains beyond.

The closest access points to the Tank Mountains on the south and east is Hyder, by way of the communities of Dateland and Sentinel on Interstate 8.

See also
 List of mountain ranges of Yuma County, Arizona
 List of mountain ranges of Arizona

References

Mountain ranges of the Sonoran Desert
Mountain ranges of the Lower Colorado River Valley
Mountain ranges of Yuma County, Arizona
Mountain ranges of Arizona